Gunung (also spelled Gunong) is the Malay and Indonesian word for mountain —it is regularly used in volcano (as Gunung Berapi) and mountain names throughout Southeast Asia.

Mountains using the prefixes Gunung / Gunong 

The following are mountains that officially use the prefixes Gunung or Gunong.

Malaysia

 Gunung Angsi
 Gunung Batu Brinchang
 Gunung Banang
 Gunung Belumut
 Gunung Benarat
 Gunung Jerai
 Gunung Kinabalu
 Gunung Korbu
 Gunung Lambak
 Gunung Ledang
 Gunung Ma'okil
 Gunung Mulu
 Gunung Murud
 Gunung Nuang
 Gunong Pueh
 Gunung Pulai
 Gunung Santubong
 Gunung Tahan
 Gunung Trus Madi

Indonesia

 Gunung Agung 
 Gunung Arjuna
 Gunung Batur 
 Gunung Batok
 Gunung Bromo 
 Gunung Ciremai 
 Gunung Dempo 
 Gunung Galunggung 
 Gunung Gede 
 Gunung Jayawijaya
 Gunung Kaba 
 Gunung Kembar
 Gunung Kemukus
 Gunung Kerinci 
 Gunung Krakatau
 Gunung Kemiri 
 Gunung Leuser 
 Gunung Merapi
 Gunung Nona 
 Gunung Rinjani  
 Gunung Salak 
 Gunung Salahutu
 Gunung Seblat 
 Gunung Semeru
 Gunung Sumbing 
 Gunung Sinabung
 Gunung Sipiso-Piso
 Gunung Tambora
 Gunung Tangkuban Perahu
 Gunung Toba

Reference 

Indonesian words and phrases
Malay words and phrases